On January 15, 2010, the Department of Defense complied with a court order and published a list of Detainees held in the Bagram Theater Internment Facility that included the name Hajji Raiz.

There were 645 names on the list, which was dated September 22, 2009, and was heavily redacted.

According to historian Andy Worthington, author of The Guantanamo Files, he was called "a key terrorist leader".
He was reported to have been captured with bomb-making material, and have been a "major improvised explosive device facilitator".

He was reported to have been captured in July 2007 in Bati Kot, Nangarhar, Afghanistan.

References

Bagram Theater Internment Facility detainees
Living people
Year of birth missing (living people)